25 Aniversario (Eng.: twenty-fifth anniversary) is a compilation album released by Juan Gabriel in 1996. This is a compilation album featuring: Duets, special versions, alternate versions, b sides and solo numbers.

Te Sigo Amando - 1st version with mariachi, available on: Ella 1980 (Album available for limited time only)

No Tengo Dinero (Japanese version)

Déjame Vivir (featuring Rocío Dúrcal)

No Volverás a Verme (featuring La Prieta Linda)

Me He Quedado Solo (Japanese version)

17 Años (featuring  María Victoria)

Perdóname, Olvídalo (featuring Rocío Dúrcal)

Qué Bello es el Amor (featuring Estela Nuñez)

Disc 1

Disc 2

References

Juan Gabriel compilation albums
1996 compilation albums